"Need To" is a song written and recorded by the American nu metal band Korn for their self-titled debut album. It was released as the album's second single in April 1995.

Music and structure
The song features elements of an older Korn song called "Alive", which was found on their demo tape, Neidermayer's Mind. "Alive" was eventually reworked and re-recorded for the band's sixth studio album, Take a Look in the Mirror.

Concept

In 2015, Johnathan Davis disclosed that the song's subject was Aimee Echo of Human Waste Project. "We were really good friends back in the day, and we never hooked up, and never did anything, but the vibe was there. I don’t think I ever told her this, but I guess she’s going to find out now…”

Credits

 Jonathan Davis - vocals
 Munky - rhythm guitar
 Head - lead guitar
 Fieldy - bass
 David Silveria - drums
 Produced by Ross Robinson
 Eddy Schreyer – mastering
 Stephen Stickler – photography
 Jay Papke/Dante Ariola – art direction and design
 Chuck Johnson – engineering and mixing

Track listing

US Radio Promo
CD5" ESK 6981
 "Need To" – 4:02

References

External links

Korn songs
1994 songs
1995 singles
Songs written by Reginald Arvizu
Songs written by Jonathan Davis
Songs written by James Shaffer
Songs written by David Silveria
Songs written by Brian Welch